A roof is the cover at the top of a building.

Roof may also refer to:

People
 Dylann Roof (born 1994), American perpetrator of a 2015 mass shooting
 Gene Roof (born 1958), American baseball outfielder and manager
 Kemar Roofe (born 1993), English footballer
 Phil Roof (born 1941), American baseball catcher, coach, and manager
 Ted Roof (born 1963), American football player and coach

Other uses
 Roof (rock formation), a rock overhang that reach, or nearly reach, the horizontal
 Roof (Chinese constellation), one of the 28 mansions of the Chinese constellations 
 Roof (category theory), a generalization of the notion of relation between two objects of a category
 Automobile roof, the top  covering of a vehicle
 "Roof", a song by DaBaby from Back on My Baby Jesus Sh!t Again (2021)

See also
 The Roof (disambiguation)
 Rooftop (disambiguation)